Miss Paraná is a Brazilian Beauty pageant which selects the representative for the State of Paraná at the Miss Brazil contest. The pageant was created in 1955 and has been held every year since with the exception of 1990-1991, and 1993. The pageant is held annually with representation of several municipalities. Since 2021, the State director of Miss Paraná is, Cristina Ranzani. 

The following women from who competed as Miss Paraná have won Miss Brazil:

, from Curitiba, in 1964
, from Curitiba, in 1992
, from Francisco Beltrão, in 1996
Raissa Oliveira Santana, from Umuarama, in 2016

Gallery of Titleholders

Results Summary

Placements
Miss Brazil:  (1964);  (1992);  (1996); Raissa Oliveira Santana (2016)
1st Runner-Up:  (1963);  (1967); Patrícia Reginato (2005)
2nd Runner-Up: Marise Meyer Costa (1971); Grazielli Soares Massafera (2004); Vivian Noronha Cia (2007); Marylia Bernardt Lila (2010); Amanda Paggi (2020)
3rd Runner-Up: Marizabel do Roccio (1984); Kelly Kaniak de Oliveira (2002; later 2nd Runner-Up)
4th Runner-Up: Karin Japp Fuxreiter (1957); Cilmara Maria Camargo (1974); Cláudia Azzolini Chueiri (1976)
Top 5/Top 7/Top 8: Rosemary Raduhy (1965); Delzi Captan (1968); Maria Regina Corzânego (1970); Maria Alves de Oliveira (1975); Débora de Almeida Rosa (1977); Ísis Stocco (2013)
Top 10/Top 11/Top 12: Suzy Mara Samways (1978);  (1981); Ronimar Machado (1982); Elisa Gizely Kasminseki (1986); Sara Maria Lau de Souza (1987); Karla Cristina Kwiatkowski (1988); Cris Thomaszeck (1997); Jaqueline Amâncio (1998); Marken Maria Valerius (1999); Fernanda Letícia Schirr (2000); Ticiana Milanese Franco (2001); Elaine Lopes da Silva (2003); Bronie Cordeiro Alteiro (2008); Karine Martins de Souza (2009); Shaienne Emillinn Borges (2022)
Top 15/Top 16: Gabriela Cristina Pereira (2011); Nathaly Goolkate (2014); Gabriela Gallas (2015); Patrícia Garcia (2017); Djenifer Frey (2019)

Special Awards
Miss Photogenic: Ana Maria Felício (1958); Elisa Gizely Kasminseki (1986); Karla Cristina Kwiatkowski (1988)
Miss Congeniality:  (1963);  (1996)
Miss Be Emotion: Raissa Oliveira Santana (2016)
Miss Ellus Challenge: Raissa Oliveira Santana (2016)

Titleholders

Table Notes

References

External links
Official Miss Brasil Website

Women in Brazil
Paraná
Miss Brazil state pageants